James Elliott "Jaime" Smith (born July 11, 1989) is an American professional basketball player for ADA Blois of the Pro A. Standing at 1.90 m (6 ft. 3 in.), he plays at the point guard positions.
He is the younger brother of former basketball player Joe Troy Smith.

Professional career

Clubs
In June 2015 Smith signed with the Belgium club Liège Basket, after a season with the Fribourg Olympic in Switzerland.

On June 10, 2017, Jaime Smith signed with the Italian basketball club, Pallacanestro Cantù, in the top-tier LBA.

On June 7, 2018, Smith became new player for Dinamo Sassari.

On August 1, 2019, he has signed contract with Teksüt Bandırma of the Turkish Basketball Super League (BSL).

On March 2, 2020, he has signed with Dinamo Sassari of the Italian Lega Basket Serie A.

On July 11, 2020, he has signed with Pallacanestro Cantù of the Lega Basket Serie A (LBA).

On July 5, 2022, after recovering from a torn ACL, he signed with the ADA Blois of the LNB Pro A.

References

External links
Legabasket.it profile
UAH Chargers Player biography

1989 births
Living people
ADA Blois Basket 41 players
Alabama–Huntsville Chargers men's basketball players
American expatriate basketball people in Belgium
American expatriate basketball people in Italy
American expatriate basketball people in Portugal
American expatriate basketball people in Switzerland
American expatriate basketball people in Ukraine
American men's basketball players
Bandırma B.İ.K. players
Basketball players from Birmingham, Alabama
BC Khimik players
Dinamo Sassari players
Fribourg Olympic players
Lega Basket Serie A players
Liège Basket players
Pallacanestro Cantù players
Point guards